MacIntyre or McIntyre is a Scottish surname, relating to Clan MacIntyre. Its meaning is "Son of the Carpenter or Wright".  The corresponding English name is Wright.

People surnamed MacIntyre, Macintyre
 
 Alasdair MacIntyre, Scottish philosopher
 Angus Macintyre
 Ben Macintyre
 Carlyle Ferren MacIntyre
 Colin MacIntyre
 David Lowe MacIntyre
 Donal MacIntyre
 Donald MacIntyre (disambiguation)
 Drew MacIntyre
 Dunc MacIntyre
 Duncan Ban MacIntyre
 Duncan McIntyre (explorer)
 Elisabeth MacIntyre
 Elizabeth McIntyre
 Ernest MacIntyre
 F. Gwynplaine MacIntyre
 Hilke MacIntyre
 Jason MacIntyre
 John Macintyre
 Leanne MacIntyre
 Marguerite MacIntyre
 Michael McIntyre (comedian)
 Michael McIntyre (sailor)
 Mike MacIntyre
 Mike McIntyre, American politician
 Roly MacIntyre
 Scott MacIntyre
 Sheila Scott Macintyre
 Stuart Macintyre
 William MacIntyre

See also

 McIntyre

References 

Gaelic-language surnames